Gawler Ranges is a mountain range in South Australia.

Gawler Ranges may also refer to the following places in South Australia.
 
Gawler Ranges National Park, a protected area
Gawler Ranges, South Australia, a locality
Gawler Ranges Conservation Park,  a protected area
Gawler Ranges Important Bird Area, a designation associated with the Gawler Ranges National Park.

See also
Gawler Range Volcanics
Gawler (disambiguation)